Wyaston is a hamlet in Derbyshire, England. It is located 3 miles south of Ashbourne.

Wyaston is in the civil parish of Edlaston and Wyaston.

A community hall is in use at Wyaston village.

History 
The village was recorded in Domesday, as Widerdestune, meaning 'Wīgh(e)ard's farm'. It once was a township in the parish, and although less prominent because of the church at Edlaston, it eventually became the larger settlement, with 25 houses and 122 inhabitants by 1848. A key landowner of the time was William Greaves. Wyaston House was described at the time as a mansion and seat of Nathaniel Need. Wyaston Grove was occupied by Rev John Grundy. There was a Methodist chapel in the village until the 20th century.

See also
Listed buildings in Edlaston and Wyaston

References

Hamlets in Derbyshire
Derbyshire Dales